The Key and the Ring (Swedish Nyckeln och ringen) is a 1947 Swedish comedy film directed by and starring Anders Henrikson. The cast also includes Aino Taube, Lauritz Falk and  Eva Dahlbeck. The film's sets were designed by the art director Max Linder.

Cast
 Anders Henrikson as 	John Berner
 Aino Taube as 	Anna Berner
 Sven-Axel Carlsson as 	Harald Berner
 Ulf Berggren as Birger Berner
 Lauritz Falk as 	Ivar Berner
 Hilda Borgström as 	Grandma
 Eva Dahlbeck as 	Eva Berg
 Ulla Sallert as Margareta Löving
 Olle Hilding as 	Falk

References

Bibliography 
 Qvist, Per Olov & von Bagh, Peter. Guide to the Cinema of Sweden and Finland. Greenwood Publishing Group, 2000.

External links 
 

1947 films
Swedish comedy films
1947 comedy films
1940s Swedish-language films
Films directed by Anders Henrikson
Swedish black-and-white films
1940s Swedish films